William Fraser McDowell (February 4, 1858–April 26, 1937) was an American bishop of the Methodist Episcopal Church, elected in 1904.  He was born in Millersburg, Ohio, U.S.

Education

William earned the A.B. degree in 1879 from Ohio Wesleyan University, Delaware, Ohio.  He earned an S.T.B. degree at Boston University in 1882.  While at Ohio Wesleyan, McDowell was the founding editor of The Phi Gamma Delta magazine.

Ordained ministry
From 1882 until 1890, Rev. McDowell served these appointments as an ordained minister of the North Ohio Annual Conference of the M.E. Church:  Lodi, Ohio (1882–83), Oberlin, Ohio (1883–85), and Tiffin, Ohio (1885–90).

He then became the chancellor of the University of Denver, serving 1890–99.  During this time he was also a member of the Colorado State Board of Charities and Corrections (1894–99).

In 1899 he became the corresponding secretary of the Board of Education of the M.E. Church, serving until his election to the episcopacy.  He also became a member of the International Committee of the Young Men's Christian Association.

Episcopal ministry

As a bishop, McDowell also served as president of the Religious Education Society (1905–06).  He was a Yale lecturer on preaching, and was noted as a preacher to preachers.

Bishop McDowell died 26 April 1937 in Washington, D.C., and was buried at Oak Grove Cemetery in Delaware, Ohio.

Works 

 
 
 
 
 
 
  Reprinted as

See also

 List of bishops of the United Methodist Church
 :Category:Bishops of the Methodist Episcopal Church

References
 
 "McDowell, William Fraser" in The New Schaff-Herzog Encyclopedia of Religious Knowledge, Samuel Macauley Jackson, D.D., LL.D., Editor-in-Chief, Grand Rapids, Michigan:  Baker Book House, 1954.  
 Methodism:  Ohio Area (1812–1962), edited by John M. Versteeg, Litt. D., D.D. (Ohio Area Sesquicentennial Committee, 1962).

1858 births
1937 deaths
People from Millersburg, Ohio
American Methodist bishops
Ohio Wesleyan University alumni
Bishops of the Methodist Episcopal Church
Chancellors of the University of Denver
Burials at Oak Grove Cemetery, Delaware, Ohio
20th-century Methodist bishops
YMCA leaders